Josef Nüsser (born 13 July 1931) was a Czech skier. He competed in the Nordic combined event at the 1956 Winter Olympics.

References

External links
 

1931 births
Living people
Czech male Nordic combined skiers
Olympic Nordic combined skiers of Czechoslovakia
Nordic combined skiers at the 1956 Winter Olympics
Place of birth missing (living people)